= Sofie Quidenus-Wahlforss =

Tech entrepreneur

Sofie Quidenus-Wahlforss (born 1983 in Austria) is a tech entrepreneur and the founder of multiple companies, including omni:us.

== Career ==
Quidenus-Wahforss founded her first business at 21 years old, developing a book scanner capable of digitizing books. She also founded a company called Qidenus Technologies and owns the patent of the Vshape scanner Technology. In 2015, she founded a company called omni:us, a platform using artificial intelligence, capable of reading handwriting and analyzing business data. The company is mostly active in the insurance sector and closed a first round of funding ($19.5 million) in 2018.

=== Public speaking ===
Quidenus-Wahlforss is a regular speaker at major technology conferences such as Slush, Noah, TOA and TechCrunch Disrupt.

=== Awards ===
Quidenus-Wahlforss has been selected as one of the World's Top 50 Women in Tech in 2018 and was also part of the Europe's Top 50 Women in Tech the same year by the magazine Forbes.
